Baradadivi is a village development committee in Achham District in the Seti Zone of western Nepal. According to the 1991 Nepal census, it has a population of 3314 and had 644 houses in the village. At the time of the 2001 Nepal census, the population was 3857, of which 45% was literate.
The population is entirely Hindu.

References

Populated places in Achham District
Village development committees in Achham District